The Doughgirls is a three-act play written by Joseph Fields. Producer Max Gordon staged it on Broadway, where it debuted at the Lyceum Theatre on December 30, 1942. The play is a comedy about three unmarried women sharing a room in an overcrowded hotel in Washington, D.C. during World War II. The Broadway production was a hit that ran for 671 performances and closed on July 29, 1944. It was adapted as a film of the same name in 1944.

Cast and characters
The characters and cast from the Broadway production are given below:

Film adaptation
Warner Bros. paid $250,000 for the right to adapt the play as a movie. James V. Kern and Sam Hellman wrote the screenplay, which had to remove the play's implications of extramarital sex to be accepted by the censors at the Breen Office. Kern directed the film, which was titled The Doughgirls.

References

External links
 

1942 plays
Broadway plays
Comedy plays
English-language plays
American plays adapted into films
Plays set in the 1940s
Plays set in Washington, D.C.